Madeleine Hoover (born December 17, 1998), is an American women's International motorcycle trials rider.

Hoover has been a member of the American Women's Trial des Nations team several times and was  NATC Women's Pro Class Champion.

Biography
Hoover was born in Raleigh, North Carolina,

In 2013, Hoover won her first NATC Trials Championship. She won the opening two rounds in New York, then took a 2nd and a 1st place in Vermont. She won again in Arizona, and ended her season with a 2nd place and a win in New Mexico. She took the title without contesting the final two rounds.

In 2014, Hoover took 1st place on the opening day in Colorado, and finished third on day 2. In Kansas, Hoover took the series lead with a win and a 2nd place. Hoover then won in Pennsylvania. At the final rounds in Tennessee, she won the championship title on the opening day with a win. She moved up to the Women's Expert Sportsman class on day two, taking a 3rd-place finish.

For 2015, Hoover won the opening two rounds of the Eastern series in Nebraska, following up with a second and a 3rd in Ohio, which was enough to take her third title. In the Western series, Rachel Hassler prevailed over Hoover. Hoover came in second for the championship. She was selected for the 2015 Trial des Nations team with Hassler and Caroline Allen.

During the 2016 season, Hoover contested both the Women's FIM Trial World Championship and the NATC nationals. In the NATC East, Hoover took two second places in Florida and two third places in Tennessee, ultimately finishing third in the championship. In the Western series she took 2nd and 3rd in Oregon, and two runner-up spots in Colorado. Hoover was second place in the championship behind Christy Williams.

In 2017, Hoover signed with the Gas Gas Factory team. The NATC added a Women's Pro class and Hoover claimed the title, winning seven of the eight rounds. Hoover competed in the newly added Women's Trial 2 class, taking a World podium and her first world championship points on the opening day with a 3rd place, followed by a 4th place on day two. In Czechoslovakia, Hoover came in ninth two times and placed seventh in the championship. In Italy, she was part of the American Women's Trial de Nations team that took a 6th-place finish in the event.

Gas Gas USA announced that Hoover would be part of the US factory team for the 2018 season. Hoover took the 2018 NATC Women's Pro title winning all eight rounds she contested. Competing in the FIM World Women's Trial 2 class, she came in second twice in Japan, third in France and sixth in England giving her second place overall in the World Championships.

National Trials Championship Career

International Trials Championship Career

Honors
 US National NATC Women's Trials Champion 2013, 2014
 US National NATC Eastern Women's Expert Sportswoman Champion 2015
 US National NATC Women's Pro Trials Champion 2017, 2018, 2019, 2021

See also
NATC Trials Championship
FIM Trial European Championship
FIM Trial World Championship

References 

1998 births
Living people
Sportspeople from Raleigh, North Carolina
American motorcycle racers
Motorcycle trials riders